Victor Helu (6 April 1983 – 18 December 2009) was a Namibian footballer with F.C. Civics Windhoek of the Namibia Premier League and the Namibia national football team. Helu was stabbed to death in Windhoek on 18 December 2009.

Helu was one of Namibia’s most respected and experienced soccer players. He started his career Premier League career with Ramblers in 2002, before joining Civics in 2007. He made his debut for the Brave Warriors in 2002 against Botswana and went on to win 15 caps for his country. His last appearance for the Brave Warriors came in March 2008 against Malawi.

References

1983 births
2009 deaths
Namibian men's footballers
Namibia international footballers
F.C. Civics Windhoek players
Male murder victims
Namibian murder victims
People murdered in Namibia
Deaths by stabbing in Namibia
2009 crimes in Namibia
2000s murders in Namibia
2009 murders in Africa
Association footballers not categorized by position